Axel Toupane (born July 23, 1992) is French professional basketball player for Paris Basketball of the LNB Pro A. Toupane also represents the senior French national team in international events. At 2.01 m (6'7") tall and 101 kg (223 lbs.), he plays at the shooting guard and small forward positions.

Professional career

SIG Strasbourg (2011–2015)
From 2008 to 2011, Toupane spent time with the Élan Béarnais Pau-Orthez and SIG Strasbourg under-21 teams before joining the SIG Strasbourg senior squad for the 2011–12 LNB Pro A season. As a rookie, he averaged 2.5 points and 1.4 rebounds in 22 French Pro A League games. In the 2012–13 season, Toupane averaged 3.9 points and 1.9 rebounds per game in 35 games as he helped Strasbourg reach the French Leaders Cup Final. He was considerably more effective the following season, as he averaged 6.1 points and 2.5 rebounds per game, playing in 41 games.

Following the 2013–14 season, Toupane entered the 2014 NBA Draft, but he was not selected. He then competed in the 2014 NBA Summer League for the Dallas Mavericks' affiliated team, for which he averaged 3.5 points and 2.0 rebounds per game over four games. He returned to Strasbourg following his play in the Summer League, and in the 2014–15 season, Toupane averaged 7.5 points, 2.5 rebounds and 1.4 assists per game in 42 Pro A games. Strasbourg finished as the regular-season leaders for a second straight year in 2015 and also won the French Cup and the French Leaders Cup.

Raptors 905 (2015–2016)
On July 23, 2015, Toupane signed with the Toronto Raptors after having averaged 4.3 points and 1.7 rebounds in three Summer League games for the team. On October 24, 2015, he was waived by the Raptors after appearing in two NBA preseason games.

On October 31, 2015, Toupane was acquired by the Raptors' affiliate team in the NBA Development League, the Raptors 905. On November 19, he made his debut for the Raptors 905 in a 109–104 loss to the Maine Red Claws, recording 17 points, 10 rebounds, four assists and one steal in 30 minutes of playing time.

Denver Nuggets (2016)
On March 3, 2016, Toupane signed a 10-day contract with the Denver Nuggets after having averaged 14.6 points, 5.6 rebounds, 3.6 assists and 1.0 steals over 32 games in the D-League. The next day, he made his NBA debut in a 121–120 loss to the Brooklyn Nets, recording one rebound in five minutes off the bench. He later signed a second 10-day contract with the Nuggets on March 14, and a multi-year contract on March 25. At the conclusion of the 2015–16 season, Toupane was named the NBA D-League Most Improved Player. On October 15, 2016, Toupane was waived by the Nuggets.

Milwaukee Bucks / Return to the 905 (2016–2017)
On October 30, 2016, Toupane was reacquired by the Raptors 905. On February 25, 2017, he signed a 10-day contract with the Milwaukee Bucks. On March 4, 2017, he was waived by the Bucks and then reacquired by the Raptors 905 later that day.

New Orleans Pelicans (2017)
On April 10, 2017, Toupane signed with the New Orleans Pelicans for the remainder of the 2016–17 season. On July 25, 2017, he was waived by the Pelicans.

Žalgiris (2017–2018)

On July 27, 2017, Toupane signed with the Lithuanian club Žalgiris of the LKL League. His solid defence helped the team in both the Euroleague, where Žalgiris reached the first Final Four in 19 years and finished in third place, and the LKL, where Žalgiris won its eighth consecutive LKL championship. Toupane was among the best players in the league cup series, which Žalgiris also won.

Olympiacos (2018–2019)
On July 17, 2018, Toupane signed a two-year deal with the Greek team Olympiacos of the EuroLeague. In 45 games, he averaged 5.8 points and 1.8 rebounds per game. On April 13, 2019, Toupane parted ways with Olympiacos.

Unicaja (2019–2020)
On August 21, 2019, Toupane signed a 1+1 year contract with Unicaja of the Liga ACB.

SIG Strasbourg (2020)
On September 1, 2020, Toupane signed with SIG Strasbourg until October 17.

Santa Cruz Warriors (2021)
On December 3, 2020, Toupane signed a training camp deal with the Golden State Warriors. On December 18, 2020, the Warriors released him.

On January 12, 2021, Toupane was included on the roster of the Warriors' affiliate, the Santa Cruz Warriors, for the 2020–21 season that took place at the ESPN Wide World of Sports Complex of Walt Disney World Resort, located near Orlando.

Return to the Bucks (2021)
On March 14, 2021, the Milwaukee Bucks announced that they had signed Toupane to a two-way contract. In the regular season he played in 8 games, starting one and averaged 1.8 points 0.8 rebounds and 0.5 assists in 7.6 minutes per game.  He played in 3 of the 4 games in the first round of the NBA playoffs against the Miami Heat, where the Bucks swept the Heat 4-0. In four total playoff games, Toupane averaged 1.3 points 1.0 rebounds on 50% shooting. Toupane won his first NBA championship when the Bucks defeated the Phoenix Suns in 6 games in the 2021 NBA Finals.

Return to Santa Cruz (2021)
On October 15, 2021, Toupane signed with the Golden State Warriors, but was waived the next day. On October 25, he was reacquired by the Santa Cruz Warriors.

Paris Basketball (2022–present)
On January 6, 2022, Toupane marked his return to France, signing with Paris Basketball of the LNB Pro A until the end of the 2023–2024 season.

National team career
As a member of the junior national teams of France, Toupane played at the 2011 FIBA Europe Under-20 Championship, where he won a bronze medal, and at the 2012 FIBA Europe Under-20 Championship, where he won a silver medal. Toupane has also been a member of the senior French national basketball team. With France's senior team, he played at the 2017 EuroBasket.

Career statistics

NBA

Regular season

|-
| style="text-align:left;"| 
| style="text-align:left;"| Denver
| 21 || 0 || 14.5 || .357 || .325 || .765 || 1.5 || .7 || .3 || .3 || 3.6
|-
| style="text-align:left;"| 
| style="text-align:left;"| Milwaukee
| 2 || 0 || 3.0 || .000 || .000 || — || .0 || .0 || .0 || .0 || .0
|-
| style="text-align:left;"| 
| style="text-align:left;"| New Orleans
| 2 || 0 || 20.5 || .625 || .333 || — || .5 || .0 || .5 || .5 || 5.5
|-
| style="text-align:left;background:#afe6ba;"| †
| style="text-align:left;"| Milwaukee
| 8 || 1 || 7.6 || .364 || .500 || .714 || .8 || .5 || .3 || .4 || 1.8
|- class="sortbottom"
| style="text-align:center;" colspan="2"| Career
| 33 || 1 || 12.5 || .378 || .326 || .750 || 1.2 || .6 || .3 || .3 || 3.1

Playoffs

|-
| style="text-align:left;background:#afe6ba;"| †
| style="text-align:left;"| Milwaukee
| 4 || 0 || 2.5 || .500 || .500 || – || 1.0 || .0 || .0 || .0 || 1.3

EuroLeague

|-
| style="text-align:left;"| 2013–14
| style="text-align:left;"| Strasbourg
| 10 || 2 || 15.1 || .355 || .143 || .500 || 2.7 || .9 || .2 || .1 || 2.5 || 2.4
|-
| style="text-align:left;"| 2017–18
| style="text-align:left;"| Žalgiris
| 34 || 21 || 15.3 || .503 || .375 || .711 || 2.1 || .5 || .4 || .1 || 6.9 || 5.8
|-
| style="text-align:left;"| 2018–19
| style="text-align:left;"| Olympiacos
| 26 || 4 || 13.3 || .382 || .361 || .815 || 1.2 || .5 || .5 || .2 || 4.8 || 3.3
|- class="sortbottom"
| style="text-align:center;" colspan=2| Career
| 70 || 27 || 14.6 || .444 || .353 || .727 || 1.9 || .5 || .4 || .1 || 5.5 || 4.4

Personal life
Toupane is the son of Jean-Aimé Toupane, a basketball coach and former player of Senegalese descent, and a French mother.

References

External links
 Official Website 
 Axel Toupane at archive.fiba.com
 Axel Toupane at esake.gr 
 Axel Toupane at euroleague.net
 Axel Toupane at eurobasket.com
 Axel Toupane at baskethotel.com
 Axel Toupane at nbadleague.com

1992 births
Living people
2019 FIBA Basketball World Cup players
Baloncesto Málaga players
BC Žalgiris players
Black French sportspeople
Denver Nuggets players
French expatriate basketball people in Canada
French expatriate basketball people in the United States
French men's basketball players
French sportspeople of Senegalese descent
Milwaukee Bucks players
National Basketball Association players from France
New Orleans Pelicans players
Olympiacos B.C. players
Paris Basketball players
Raptors 905 players
Santa Cruz Warriors players
Shooting guards
SIG Basket players
Small forwards
Sportspeople from Mulhouse
Undrafted National Basketball Association players